Gawai Dayak (previously as known as Dayak Day or Sarawak Day) is an annual festival and a public holiday celebrated by the Dayak people in Sarawak, Malaysia on 1 and 2 June. Sarawak Day is now celebrated on July 22 every year. Gawai Dayak was conceived of by the radio producers Tan Kingsley and Owen Liang and then taken up by the Dayak community. The British colonial government refused to recognise Dayak Day until 1962. They called it Sarawak Day for the inclusion of all Sarawakians as a national day, regardless of ethnic origin. It is both a religious and a social occasion recognised since 1957.

On 1 June 1963, Datuk Michael Buma, a Betong native, hosted the celebrations of the first Gawai Dayak at his home at Siol Kandis, Kuching. On 25 September 1964, Sarawak Day was gazetted as a public holiday acknowledging the formation of the Federation of Malaysia. The holiday was first celebrated on 1 June 1965 and it became a symbol of unity, aspiration and hope for the Dayak community. It is an integral part of Dayak's social life. It is a thanksgiving day marking a bountiful harvest and a time to plan for the new farming season or other endeavours ahead.

It is also celebrated by Dayak in West Kalimantan, Indonesia on the same date, although not a public holiday as well as other Dayak (particularly Iban and Bidayuh) diaspora all around Malaysia, Indonesia and a broad.

Introduction
Gawai Dayak comes from Gawai meaning festival and Dayak a collective name for the indigenous peoples of Sarawak, Indonesian Kalimantan and the interior of Borneo. The population estimate is two to four million people. The Dayaks, previously known as the Sea Dayak are mostly Iban people. Other ethnic groups such as the Bidayuh people (Land Dayak) and Orang Ulu are recognised. The Orang Ulu include the Kayans, Kenyahs and Lun Bawangs. There are over 200 riverine and hill-dwelling ethnic subgroups in the region. Although these peoples have common traits, each have their own dialect, customs, laws, territory and culture. Dayak languages are categorised as part of the Austronesian languages. The Dayaks embraced animism and paganism but in recent times, many have converted to Christianity.

Preparation 
As the festival day approaches, everyone will be busy with general tidying up, grave visiting, paddy drying and milling, collecting and preparing food and final house decoration, where necessary. The mode of celebrations of Gawai Dayak vary from place to place and preparations begin early.

Food and drink
When a longhouse agrees to host Gawai Dayak with big ritual festivals, they may need to plant extra paddy and organise labour exchange (bedurok). Rice may be purchased from towns if the festival is in a place where paddy farming is absent or insufficient. The traditional Dayak liquor is a rice wine called tuak, brewed at least one month before the Gawai Dayak. The drink is brewed from the glutinous rice from a recent harvest mixed with homemade yeast called ciping. Traditionally, tuak was made with rice milk only, but is now cut with sugar and water in a process called mandok. A stronger alcoholic beverage made by the Iban is langkau (called arak tonok, "burnt spirit" by the Bidayuh). This drink is made by distilling tuak over a fire.

Traditional cake delicacies are prepared from glutinous rice flour mixed with sugar. The cakes include sarang semut (ant nest cake), cuwan (molded cake) and kuih sepit (twisted cake). The cakes can last well whilst kept inside a jar because they are deep-fried until hardened. Penganan iri (a discus-shaped cakes) are made just before the festival day because they do not keep well. This is because the cake is lifted from the hot frying oil while not fully hardened.  The sugar used can be the brown nipah sugar or cane sugar.

Before the eve of Gawai, the longhouse residents may organise a hunting or fishing trip to gather wild meat and fish. Both can be preserved with salt in a jar, or smoked over a firewood platform above the hearth. Inedible animal parts like horns, teeth, claws, and feathers are used to decorate and repair traditional costumes.

Decoration of the longhouse
The longhouse is cleaned, repaired and repainted by cooperation amongst its residents. The longhouse is constructed as a unique place of living and worship. Its main post (tiang pemun) is the designated starting point of all the building materials (pun ramu) and must remain intact. Timber and wooden materials for repairs are obtained from nearby reserve forests (pulau galau or pulau ban) or purchased in towns. A pantar (long chair) may be built along the upper area of the ruai (gallery). The seat is raised and the tanju (verandah wall) is used as the backrest. Some old wooden longhouses (rumah kayu) are renovated with concrete and bricks to make a terraced structure (rumah batu).

The inside walls of the longhouse are decorated with ukir murals portraying tree and wild animal motifs. Men with decorating skills make split bamboo designs. Women decorate living room walls by hanging their handwoven ceremonial clothes called pua kumbu and other handicrafts. The Orang Ulu are famous for their colourful paintings of the tree of life on their house walls and their house posts are elaborately carved. Highly decorated shields are displayed near the family room door. Heirloom jars, brassware, and old human skulls obtained during raids or trade sojourns, if still kept, are cleaned and displayed. Deer horns may be secured to the longhouse posts in order to hold highly decorated swords and other household items.

Gawai Dayak Eve
On Gawai Eve, people gather sago, aping, sawit or coconut palm shoots which are used for making meat stews. Vegetables such as wild midin fern, fiddlehead fern, bamboo shoots, tapioca leaves and Dayak round brinjals from nearby jungle, farms or gardens are also gathered.

After the gathering of plants and vegetables early in the morning, the poultry is slaughtered.  Enough meat is cooked in mid-aged thin-walled bamboo logs to make a traditional dish called pansoh (Iban: lulun). The meat is first mixed with traditional herbs like lemongrass, ginger, bungkang leaves and salt. Any remaining meat is preserved in salt and mixed with kepayang leaves and detoxified seeds. Animal heads are roasted on an open fire to be served hot with tuak. Wooden cooking implements are made from small tree logs.

Some glutinous rice is cooked in bamboo nodes to soak up the bamboo aroma. Normal rice will be cooked in pots at the kitchen hearth. The addition of pandan leaves also gives a special aroma. Smoke from the fire wood also gives a distinctive aroma. Some Dayaks, especially Orang Ulu, will wrap rice in long green leaves (daun long) before steaming it inside a pot. Rice may also be cooked using a gas stove or rice cooker.

Highly decorated mats for guests to sit on are laid out on the longhouse gallery which runs the entire length of the longhouse. The act is called beranchau ("mat spreading and adjoining") which marks the opening of the gawai. The Dayaks make various types of traditional hand-woven mats. There are reed mats woven with colourful designs, lampit rattan mats, bidai tree bark mats and peradani mats. The walls of most family rooms and galleries are decorated with traditional blankets such as the woven Pua Kumbu and the tied cloth (kain kebat) blankets which are made with unique Dayak designs. During the festival, women are keen to display the products of their skills and hard work at mat-making and hand-weaving. Some traditional baskets are also seen. Some sets of traditional musical instruments are also displayed in the gallery.

Traditional dress
Men and women may wear nigepan, the traditional costume, especially when guests are arriving. The traditional dress of men is a loincloth (sirat or cawat), animal skin coat (gagong), peacock and hornbill feathers (lelanjang) headwear, chains over the neck (marik), silver armlets and anklets along with a shield, sword, and spear. Men are decorated with tribal tattoos (kalingai or pantang in Iban) which signify their life experience and journey. A frog design on the front of the man's neck and/or tegulun designs on the backs of the hand indicate the wearer has chopped off a human head or killed a man in military combat. However, some designs are based on marine life which are meant for protection and rescue of the wearers when on the water.

Women wear a handwoven cloth (kain betating) worn around the waist, a rattan and brass ring high corset around the upper body, selampai (a long piece of scalp) worn over the shoulders, a woven beaded chain over the neck and shoulders (marik empang), a decorated high-comb (sugu tinggi) over the hair lump (sanggul), a silver belt (lampit), armlet, anklet, and orb fruit purse. In the past, it was customary for Dayak women to bare their breasts as a sign of beauty. In Bidayuh Dayak society, Dayung Boris are the maidens of the Gawai Festival.

Offerings and sacrifices
Celebrations begin on the evening of 31 May with a ceremony to cast away the spirit of greed (Muai Antu Rua). Two children or men, each dragging a winnowing basket (chapan), will pass each by family's room. Every family will throw some unwanted article into the basket. The unwanted articles will then be tossed to the ground from the end of the longhouse.

At dusk, a ritual offering ceremony (miring or bedara) will take place at every family room, one after the other. Before the ceremony, ritual music called gendang rayah is performed. Old ceramic plates, tabak (big brass chalices), or containers made of split bamboo skins (kelingkang) are filled with food and drinks to be offered to the deities.

The Iban Dayaks believe in seven deities (the people of hornbill's nest, Orang Tansang Kenyalang) whose names are Sengalang Burong (the war god represented by the brahminy kite); Biku Bunsu Petara (the great priest, who is second in command), Menjaya Manang (the first shaman and god of medicine), Sempulang Gana with Semerugah (the god of agriculture and land), Selampandai (the god of creation and procreativity), Ini Inee/Andan (the god of justice) and Anda Mara (the god of fortune). Iban Dayaks also call upon the legendary and mythical people of Panggau Libau and Gelong, and other good, helpful spirits or ghosts to attend the feast. The entire pantheon of gods is cordially invited to the Gawai feast.

Offerings to the deities are placed at strategic spots: the four corners of each family room for protection of souls; in the kitchen; at the rice jar; in the gallery; the tanju; and the farm. Other highly prized possessions such as precious old jars and modern items like rice milling engines, boat engines, or a car may also be placed with offerings. Any pengaroh (charm) will be brought out for this ceremony to ensure its continuous effectiveness and to avoid madness afflicting the owner. Wallets are placed among the offerings to increase the tuah or fortune of the owners.

Each set of offerings usually contains specified odd numbers (1, 3, 5, 7) of traditional items: the cigarette nipah leaves and tobacco, betel nut and sireh leaves, glutinous rice in a hand-woven leave container (senupat), rice cakes (tumpi), sungki (glutinous rice cooked in buwan leaves), glutinuos rice cooked in bamboo logs (asi pulut lulun), penganan iri (cakes of glutinous rice flour mixed with nipah sugar), ant nest cakes and moulded cakes, poprice (made from glutinous paddy grains heated in a wok or pot), hard-boiled chicken eggs and tuak rice wine poured over or contained in a small bamboo cup.

After all the offering sets are completed, the chief of the festival thanks the gods for a good harvest, and asks for guidance, blessings and long life as he waves a cockerel over the offerings (bebiau). The cockerel is sacrificed by slicing its neck. Its wing feathers are pulled out and brushed onto its bleeding neck after which each feather is placed as a sacrifice (genselan) onto each of the offering sets. The offerings are then placed at the designated locations.

Dinner
Once the offering ceremony is completed, the family sits down for dinner, the makai di ruai (meal at gallery) or makai rami (festival meal) in the gallery of the longhouse. Each family member has contributed something. All the best traditional foods, delicacies and drinks that have been prepared are displayed.

Just before midnight, a spirit-welcoming procession (Ngalu Petara) is performed several times up and down the gallery. A beauty pageant to choose the festival's queen and king (Kumang and Keling Gawai) is sometimes conducted. The winners are chosen for completeness of their traditional costumes and beauty. The chief and elders hold a begeliga to remind everybody to keep order, peace and harmony. Heavy fines (ukom) are imposed on those who break the customary adat and festive ground rules with fighting, quarrelling, drunkenness or vandalism.

At midnight, a gong is rung to call the inhabitants to attention. The longhouse chief (tuai rumah) or host will lead a toast to longevity (Ai Pengayu) and the new year with a short prayer (sampi). The festival greeting, "Gayu Guru, Gerai Nyamai, Senang Lantang Nguan Menua" ("Wishing you longevity, wellness, and prosperity") is repeated to each other. Mistakes are forgiven and disputes are resolved. Where a bard is available, he may be asked to recite a short chant called timang ai pengayu ("Chanting the water of longevity") to bless the longevity water before the chief says the short prayer.

After dinner

After dinner, celebrations are less formal. A tree of life (ranyai) is erected in the centre of the gallery to symbolize the ritual shrine with valuable fruits. Around it, performances of the ngajat dance, sword dance (bepencha) or self-defence martial art (bekuntau) are performed after some symbolic traditional activities. The first order among the activities after dinner is the badigir, a lining up of elders and/or guests if any according to their social rank. A tabak (chalice) of food and drinks is offered to each elder in the line up by a few women of high social rank in the longhouse, normally a wife offering to her husband. A group of women in costumes led by an expert sings a pantun (praise song) befitting the status of each elder while offering a jalong (bowl) of tuak and some tabas (delicacies) to several key elders with some outstanding life achievement.

The chief among them will then be requested to symbolically split open a coconut. which symbolises the skull trophies traditionally treasured by the Iban Dayak because the skull is believed to present various types of valuable seeds for men, be they for farming or procreation purposes. In more elaborate events, the chief warrior will perform the symbolic act of clearing the pathway (ngerandang jalai). He is then followed by his warriors in performing the symbolic act of hand-railing the pathway (ngelalau jalai).

Next, follows a procession by men and women, ladies, youths and kids in traditional costumes along the gallery in honour of the elders in the line up, normally three rounds depending on the length of the longhouse. One outcome of this procession is the anointing of a kumang (princess) and a keeling (prince). After this, some of the procession participants may go for the tuak contained in several medium-sized jar (kebok or pasu) after paying a token of their appreciation to the respective owners who are normally expert brewers. This tuak is normally the pure liquid from the glutinous rice which tastes sweet but it contains a high concentration of alcohol. Tuak is normally drank after food, just like grape wine. Some foods and drinks have been served for all presents. Rice cakes are eaten as desserts.

Another important activity is the singing of traditional poems. These include pantun, ramban, jawang, sanggai and pelandai. Any honoured guests to longhouses may be asked to break open a coconut to symbolise the actions of Sengalang Burong (the god of war) during the Iban timang incantation which is called ngelanpang (cleansing the head skull to present various kinds of beneficial seeds to humankind). In the actual cleansing of the freshly taken heads, the troop leader would eat a bit of the brain with a piece of a glutinous rice before proceeding to throw away the rest of the brain using a piece of rattan swirled by him inside the skull and to slice out the flesh using his war sword. This coconut-splitting ceremony is a sign of respect and honour to the guests being offered to do so.

Other merrymaking activities which may extend to the next day include blowpipe (sumpit) contests and traditional games such as arm wrestling (bibat lengan), small log pulling (betarit lampong), rope pulling (tarit tali) and foot-banging (bapatis). Some engage in cockfighting. In modern settings, sports include football, sepak takraw (rattan kickball) and futsal. Other parlour games are played such as egg rolling, plate passing to the tune of taboh music, running in gunny sacks, and balloon blowing, while karaoke and joget dance are also popular.

Dances
There are many variations of the traditional ngajat or ajat dance. The male and female dances consist of graceful, precise and surprise movements of the body, hands and feet with occasional shouts of a battle cry. Examples are the freestyle ajat male dance, warrior dance, ngajat lesong (rice mortar dance), the ngasu hunting dance, or comical muar kesa (ant harvesting) dance for men. Women perform the freestyle female ajat dance or the ngajat pua kumbu (ritual cloth waving dance). The male dance shows strength and bravery and may imitate the movements of the hornbill, which is regarded as the king of worldly birds. The ngajat dance is accompanied by a traditional band consisting of an engkerumong set (percussion), tawak (big gong), bebendai (small gong) and bedup (drum). Orang Ulu music is played using the sape. Recordings may be used instead of a live band.

Bidayuh Dayak dances include the tolak bala (danger repealing), a dance performed before the harvest to ask for blessing and protection of the community; the totokng dance that is performed during the harvest festival to welcome the paddy soul and guests; the langi julang which is performed at the closing of the harvest festival to thank gods for bestowing good health and a rich harvest; and the eagle-warrior fight dance performed after the harvest season. Hands are held outstretched imitating the movements of the eagles as they flap their wings in flight. The eagle eventually falls unconscious so leaving the warrior as the winner. It is performed by men seeking a female partner.

Ngabang

On the first day of June, Dayak homes are opened to guests. This practice is called ngabang. Open houses may also be organised by Dayak associations or non-government organisations. This will continue until the end of June where the gawai will be closed in a ngiling bidai (mat rolling up) ceremony.

When guests arrive, tuak is offered and women line up in two rows on each side of the ladder (nyambut pengabang). The welcoming drink (ai tiki) is followed by the thirst-quenching drink (ai aus). Then, when the guests are seated, further rounds of tuak as a washing drink (ai basu), profit drink (ai untong) and respect drink (ai basa) are given. This activity is called the watering of guests or nyibur temuai.

Speeches are made such as the jaku ansah (sharpening speech) which introduces the guest of honor. The guest of honor is received with a miring offering ceremony outside the longhouse. Upon approaching the longhouse ladder, the guest of honor is asked to open a fort (muka kuta). This is represented by slashing a bamboo fence with a sword and a poem. Then, at the foot of the longhouse ladder, an animal is speared (mankan).

In ngalu pengabang, guests led by ngajat dancers and followed by the band, process to their seats in the longhouse gallery. After that, a guest prayer (biau pengabang) is recited by a talented speaker like the headman or the lemambang bard while he sways holding a chicken over the heads of guests. Before the guests are offered foods, a special speech (muka kujuk in Iban) to open the traditional cloth covering over food containers is recited.

After eating, the families of the longhouse are visited by guests. A short longhouse may have ten to thirty family rooms while moderately long may have thirty to fifty family rooms. A very long longhouse may have fifty to one hundred family rooms. It is common for Dayaks to recite and discuss their genealogy (tusut in Iban) to reinforce kinships. In the activity called bantil (persuaded drinking), women offer drinks to men to help them overcome shyness. Men traditionally reject the first offers as a sign of respect to the host. Women sing a traditional poem called pantun while offering tuak. In the activity called uti, a special guest is asked to open a coconut placed on a ceramic plate using a blunt knife without handling the coconut or breaking the plate. The coconut offered to be split open by ordinary guests tells of someone's heart and fate: white flesh is good and black flesh is bad.

Pre-Gawai and Closing
In town areas, pre-gawai are held in May in advance of the gawai proper before the citydwellers return to their respective villages.

Gawai ends around the end of June. The closing ceremony is signified by symbolically rolling back a miring ceremony mat called a bidai by each family within the longhouse. It is known as Ngiling Bidai among Iban Dayaks.

Authentic ritual festivals
Gawai Dayak celebrations may last for a month. It is during this time of year that many Dayak hold authentic ritual festivals and weddings (Melah Pinang or Gawai Lelabi) take place.

Most Iban will hold minor rites called bedara which can be bedara mata (an unripe offering) inside the family bilek room or bedara mansau (a ripe offering) at the family ruai gallery. Berunsur (cleansing) is performed at the family tanju (verandah). Rituals called gawa are the Sandau Ari (midday festival); Tresang Mansau (red bamboo pole); and Gawai Kalingkang.

Ritual feasts of the Saribas and Skrang region include Gawai Bumai (agricultural festival) which comprises Gawai Batu (whetstone festival), Gawai Benih (a paddy seed festival) and gawai basimpan (paddy storing festival); and Gawai Burong (a bird festival). The bird festival is performed earlier in the festive period to avoid spoiling of rice wine by the spirit Indai Bilai if the entombment festival for the dead (Gawai Antu or Ngelumbong) is also held within the same longhouse.

In the Baleh region, the Iban ritual festivals include the Gawai Baintu-intu (wellness festival); Gawai Bumai (farming festival); Gawai Amat (proper festival to request divine supernatural assistance); Gawai Ngelumbung (tomb-building festival) and Gawai Mimpi (festival based on dream messages from the spirits).

Fortune related festivals include a Gawai Mangkong Tiang (main house post hammering festival) for any newly completed longhouses.; Gawai Tuah (fortune festival) which comprises three stages i.e. Gawai Ngiga Tuah (fortune seeking festival), Gawai Namaka Tuah (fortune welcoming festival) and Gawai nindokka tuah (fortune safekeeping festival) and Gawai Tajau (jar festival). The health-related festivals which may be performed are the Gawai Sakit (healing festival) which takes place if the belian rituals, sugi sakit (supernatural cleansing) or renong sakit (supernatural curing) are unsuccessful.

For most of these traditional festivals, sacred invocation and incantations called pengap or timang are performed throughout the night(s) by a bard (lemambang) and his assistants or a manang (healer).

Christian celebrations
Christian Dayaks replace the traditional offering ceremony with a prayer session within the family room. The associated church service leader is called tuai sembiang.

See also
 List of Harvest Festivals
 Miss Cultural Harvest Festival

References

External links
 Pictures

Malaysian culture
Religion in Malaysia
June observances
May observances
Public holidays in Malaysia